Auguste Alfred Rubé (20 June 1817 – 13 April 1899) was a French painter.

Biography 
Born in the 9th arrondissement of Paris, Rubé was an innovator in the field of theatrical set design. This "decorator of rare ingenuity", focused on a local color search corresponding to the Romantic mouvement. He had been at a good school with his master Pierre-Luc-Charles Ciceri, the designer of the Opéra-Comique, whose daughter he had just married. Ciceri had the confidence of Alexandre Dumas, who reported to him and his students, Rubé, Charles Séchan, Jules Diéterle, Édouard Desplechin, but Rubé wanted to do even better: not only did he try to reproduce the landscapes accurately, he made them picturesque.

The setting of the 2nd act of Âme en peine, by Friedrich von Flotow to a libretto by Jules-Henri Vernoy de Saint-Georges, made for the Paris Opera, served him, in a way, as a premiere. The operas for which he then brushed the sets are masterpieces: in 1846, he created the set for the 2nd act of Donizetti's Betly.

He also created the set representing the Roman Forum in Louis Bouilhet's Faustine at the Théâtre de la Porte-Saint-Martin, the set of the Montmartre Cemetery in Edmond de Goncourt's Germinie Lacerteux at the Théâtre de l'Odéon, the setting of the mysterious park in Joséphin Péladan's Sphynx, at the Théâtre-Français, a night effect of the banks of the Seine near the Institut de France in Jean de Thommeray by Émile Augier and Jules Sandeau, in the same theatre.

In 1858, he had painted a superb ceiling for the Théâtre-Français, depicting Apollo riding on Pegasus among the characters who inspired the masterpieces of the tragic and comic French actors, which, consumed by gas, was repainted in 1879 by Alexis-Joseph Mazerolle. The last composition he worked on was the curtain of the new Opéra-Comique. The one of the Opera was also his.

By the time he died, at the age of eighty, Rubé had become the dean of painters and decorators. He had been made a chevalier of the Legion of Honour, on 14 August 1869. To those who regretted that his painting skills were limited to decoration, he replied with a good smile: "What do you want, I have theatre in my blood"!

Rubé died on April 13, 1899 in the 10th arrondissement of Paris.

Judgement

References

External links 
 Auguste Alfred Rubé on The Morgan Library and Museum
 Auguste Alfred Rubé on The Morgan Library and Museum
 Le travail aux champs, oil on canvas( 1876)

1817 births
1899 deaths
Painters from Paris
19th-century French painters
Scenographers
Chevaliers of the Légion d'honneur